Tony Jermaine Earl (born April 30, 1981), later known as Latonius or The Latonius, is an American musician, singer, songwriter, choir director, and author. The pop rock, soul, and gospel singer released his debut album Say Yes on November 15, 2013.

Career

Television appearance
In late 2014, Latonius had his first big television debut on the German version of Rising Star, which put him in front of 2.1 million viewers. He had the opportunity to meet and be judged by American singer Anastacia and German singers Gentleman, Sasha and Joy Denalane.
Latonius quickly became the favorite of the large television audience, jury and the press.

Discography

Albums
2012: Never Too Late
2013: Home
2013: Say Yes – Deluxe Edition
2018: The Vision
2021: Intimacy

Singles
2017: "Life of a Champion" (official anthem to the HERQUL German Boxing Awards 2017)
2017: "Up on a Hill"
2018: "Lift Him Up"
2018: "Sanador (Healer)"
2019: "Magic of Xmas" 
2020: "Blessings come down"
2020: "Free"
2021: "Back 2 Soul"
2021: "The Little Drummer Boy"

Collaborations
2005: "Wake Up Call" (Dwight Robson & Voices of Gospel)
2005: "Higher, Higher" (Dwight Robson & Voices of Gospel)
2005: "It Won't Be Very Long" (Dwight Robson & Voices of Gospel)
2014: "Gorila" (Rising Star performance)

References

External links
 
  LIIMW International Music Workshop
  Latonius Spotify

American evangelicals
American performers of Christian hip hop music
1981 births
People from Los Angeles
Living people
21st-century American male singers
21st-century American singers
American male singer-songwriters
Singer-songwriters from California